West Berkshire Council is the local authority of West Berkshire in Berkshire, England. It is a unitary authority, having the powers of a non-metropolitan county and district council combined. West Berkshire is divided into 30 wards, electing 52 councillors. The council was created by the Local Government Act 1972 as the Newbury District Council and replaced five local authorities: Bradfield Rural District Council, Hungerford Rural District Council, Newbury Borough Council, Newbury Rural District Council and Wantage Rural District Council. On 1 April 1998 it was renamed West Berkshire Council and since then has been a unitary authority, assuming the powers and functions of the abolished Berkshire County Council within the district. In the 2015 election the Conservatives won 48 out of 52 seats. In 2019, they won 24 out of 43 seats, losing half of their councillors.

History
The council was formed by the Local Government Act 1972 as the Newbury District Council. It replaced Bradfield Rural District Council, Hungerford Rural District Council, Newbury Borough Council, Newbury Rural District Council and Wantage Rural District Council. The first election to the Newbury District Council was held in 1973, initially acting as a shadow authority alongside the outgoing authorities until the district formally came into being on 1 April 1974.

From 1974 until 1998 Newbury District Council was a lower-tier district authority, with Berkshire County Council being the upper-tier authority for the area. In 1998 Berkshire County Council was abolished and the county's six districts became unitary authorities, taking over the functions of the county council within their respective areas. During the transition period the council decided to change the district's name from Newbury to West Berkshire with effect from 1 April 1998, being the same day the council became a unitary authority.

Politics

West Berkshire Council is elected every four years, with, currently, 43 councillors being elected at each election. From the first election to the unitary authority in 1997 to the 2003 election the Liberal Democrats had a majority and they then kept control with the chairman's casting vote until 2005.

In 2005 the Conservative party gained a majority, which they have held since. 

In the 2019 United Kingdom local elections the Conservatives lost councillors, though retaining their majority, whilst the Liberal Democrats made significant gains and the Green Party also made gains.

Composition

The council composition is:

Executive

Premises
The council's headquarters are the Council Offices on Market Street in Newbury. The building was purpose-built for Newbury District Council at a cost of £3.5 million and was completed in 1982.

References

Leader and cabinet executives
Unitary authority councils of England
West Berkshire District
Local education authorities in England
Local authorities in Berkshire
Billing authorities in England